The 1985 Inter-Island Games were the first Island Games, and were held in Isle of Man, from July 18 to July 24, 1985.

Medal table

Sports
The sports chosen for the games were:

External links
 1985 Island Games

Island Games, 1985
Sport in the Isle of Man
Island Games, 1985
Island Games
Multi-sport events in the Isle of Man
International sports competitions hosted by the Isle of Man
July 1985 sports events in Europe